James Lloyd Breck (June 27, 1818 – April 2, 1876) was a priest, educator, and missionary of the Episcopal Church in the United States of America.

Breck is commemorated on April 2 on the Episcopal calendar of saints.

Early life and education
Breck was born in Philadelphia County, Pennsylvania. He was the fourth son of Catherine D. née Israell and George Breck. He was baptized at All Saints Church, Torresdale, Philadelphia, in 1821. 

He attended high school at the Flushing Institute (at Flushing, New York), founded by William Augustus Muhlenberg, who inspired him to resolve at the age of sixteen to devote himself to missionary activity. Senator James Lloyd of Massachusetts and Breck's uncle financed his education at Flushing and the University of Pennsylvania. He received a B.A. from the University of Pennsylvania in 1838 and a B.D. from the General Theological Seminary in 1841. At the seminary he was heavily influenced by William Whittingham and the high church movement.

Career
In 1842, by then a deacon in the Episcopal Church, he went to the frontier of Wisconsin with two classmates, under the direction of Bishop Jackson Kemper, to found Nashotah House, intended as a monastic community, a seminary, and a center for theological work. It continues today as a seminary. Breck was ordained into the priesthood later that year by the Missionary Bishop, Jackson Kemper at the Oneida Indian settlement 150 miles north of Nashotah.

In 1850 Breck moved to Minnesota where he began another mission. On June 23, 1850 he celebrated the first Episcopal Eucharist in the La Crosse area. Two years later he began work among the Ojibway, founding St. Columba Mission.

In 1855 Breck married Jane Maria Mills, one of the teachers at the St. Columba Mission. He opened another mission at Leech Lake in 1856, and then in 1857 he moved to Faribault where he and the Rev. Solon Manney began a mission school to train clergy to work in Minnesota missions. Breck worked closely with the first Bishop of Minnesota, Henry Whipple and the mission school for clergy became Seabury Seminary which survives today as Bexley-Seabury Western Seminary in Chicago.

Jane Breck died in 1862 and Breck married Sarah Stiles in 1864.  Three years later he moved to Benicia, California to build another two institutions.

Breck was known as "The Apostle of the Wilderness".

Death

Breck died in Benicia in 1876. He was buried beneath the altar of the church he served as rector but later his body was removed and reinterred on the grounds of Nashotah House in Nashotah, Wisconsin. The recommittal service there had 14 bishops, about 100 priests, and many lay people in attendance.

Legacy
Breck's major legacies were Nashotah House Seminary, Seabury Seminary, and several other institutions since closed including Racine College in Delafield, Wisconsin, St. Augustine College in Benicia, California, and St. Mary's School in Benicia. Breck School in Golden Valley, Minnesota, founded in 1886, was named for him.

Henry M. Ackley, who was married to Breck's niece and had been connected with Nashotah House, later became a member of the Wisconsin State Senate.

Veneration 
The Rev. James Lloyd Breck is commemorated on April 3 in the calendar of the Episcopal Church (USA).

References

External links
Documents by and about James Lloyd Breck
Articles about Father James Lloyd Breck and Nashotah House, Wisconsin State Historical Society
Wisconsin Historical Society biography of Fr. Breck
Nashotah Seminary
A Commemoration Service At Seabury Seminary
History of the 2 schools in Benicia
Seabury Society

1818 births
1876 deaths
Clergy from Philadelphia
University of Pennsylvania alumni
People from Benicia, California
People from Waukesha County, Wisconsin
Anglican saints
American Episcopal priests
19th-century Christian saints
People from Faribault, Minnesota
Nashotah House people
19th-century American Episcopalians
19th-century American clergy